Krogia microphylla is a rare species of corticolous (bark-dwelling), squamulose (scaley) lichen in the family Ramalinaceae. Found in the Dominican Republic, it was formally described as a new species in 2011 by lichenologist Einar Timdal. It is only known from the type collection. The species epithet refers to the tiny squamules (up to 0.3 mm wide) that make up the thallus.

References

Ramalinaceae
Lichen species
Lichens described in 2011
Lichens of the Caribbean
Taxa named by Einar Timdal